Samuel McIntire (January 16, 1757 – February 6, 1811) was an American architect and craftsman, best known for his work in the Chestnut Street District, a classic example of Federal style architecture.

Life and career
Born in Salem, Massachusetts to housewright Joseph McIntire and Sarah (Ruck), he was a woodcarver by trade who grew into the practice of architecture. He married Elizabeth Field on October 10, 1778, and had one son. He built a simple home and workshop on Summer Street in 1786.

Starting about 1780, McIntire was hired by Salem's pre-eminent merchant and America's first millionaire, Elias Hasket Derby, for whose extended family he built or remodeled a series of houses.  McIntire taught himself the Palladian style of architecture from books, and soon had a reputation among the city's elite for designing elegant homes. In 1792, he entered a proposal in the competition for the United States Capitol.

After 1797, McIntire worked in the style of Boston architect Charles Bulfinch, who had made fashionable here the neoclassical manner of Scottish architect Robert Adam.  Unlike Bulfinch, however, whose designs were featured across the East Coast, McIntire built almost exclusively in New England. His wooden or brick houses were typically 3 stories tall, each with 4 rooms around a central hall.  In 1799, he went into business with his brothers, Joseph and Angier McIntire, who erected the structures, while at the workshop he oversaw various ornamentations, including the swags, rosettes, garlands and sheaves of wheat which dominate the interior wooden surfaces.  McIntire's Salem works include Peirce-Nichols, Peabody-Silsbee, Gardner-White-Pingree, and the Elias Haskett Derby residences.  His public buildings, all in Salem, are Assembly Hall, Hamilton Hall, Washington Hall and the courthouse (the latter two have been demolished).

He was a skilled artisan, especially in furniture, and his skill extended to sculpting.  Among his works are busts of Voltaire and John Winthrop, the first governor of Massachusetts; both are now owned by the American Antiquarian Society in Worcester, Massachusetts.

McIntire was buried in the Burying Point Cemetery, Salem, where his epitaph reads:

"In Memory of Mr. Samuel McIntire who died Feb. 6, 1811, Æt. 54. He was distinguished for Genius in Architecture, Sculpture, and Musick: Modest and sweet Manners rendered him pleasing: Industry, and Integrity respectable: He professed the Religion of Jesus in his entrance on manly life; and proved its excellence by virtuous Principle and unblemished conduct."

McIntire Chair
The McIntire Chair  is a vase-back chair, originally part of a large set, was made for Elias Hasket Derby.  The chair's overall design is based on plate 2 of George Hepplewhite's Cabinet-Maker and Upholsterer's Guide (London, 1788), but enriched considerably by the addition of relief carving to parts of the back and the front legs.  The carved grape clusters in the lunette at the base of the splat and suspended from bowknots at the top of each leg are a motif which is associated with McIntire.

Samuel McIntire Historic District
The Samuel McIntire Historic District was established in 1981, incorporating two previously established districts, Chestnut Street Historic District (1971) and Federal Street Area Historic District (1976) and adding some 249 structures on upper Essex, Broad, and Warren Streets, Dalton Parkway, and various streets in between.  The District is named for Salem's celebrated architect-carver, Samuel McIntire, who lived and worked at 31 Summer Street.

McIntire's first major commission, the Peirce-Nichols House (1782), and several of his mature works, including Hamilton Hall (1805), are preserved within the district.  Chestnut Street, where there are many Federal Era townhouses designed by McIntire, stands as a monument to the mercantile and maritime ascendancy of Salem in the latter 18th and early 19th centuries.

The District is considered to represent the greatest concentration of 17th and 18th century domestic structures anywhere in America and is one of the greatest concentrations of notable pre-1900 domestic structures extant in the U.S.  With few exceptions, the major architectural styles common to the region during the 1640-1940 period are represented.  Also included in the District are the Witch House or Jonathan Corwin House (circa 1642), churches, Broad Street Burial Ground (1655), several monuments, and the first Salem State Normal School Building (1854).

World Record for Federal furniture
In 2011, a mahogany side chair with carving attributed to Samuel McIntire sold at auction for $662,500, setting a world record for Federal furniture.  The handmade and hand-carved chair made in the late 1790s was one of a set of eight originally purchased by Elizabeth (Crowninshield) and Elias Hasket Derby.

Gallery

References

Phillips Library McIntire Papers
Essex County Registry of Deeds, Book 160 Pages 181 - 183
Cousins, Frank, and Phil Madison Riley. The Woodcarver of Salem: Samuel McIntire, His Life and Work. Boston: Little, Brown & Company, 1916
Lahikainen, Dean T. Samuel McIntire: Carving an American Style. Salem, Massachusetts: Peabody Essex Museum, 2007

External links

American woodcarvers
Architects from Massachusetts
Artists from Salem, Massachusetts
1757 births
1811 deaths
Federalist architects
18th-century American architects
19th-century American architects